Petrophile filifolia is a species of flowering plant in the family Proteaceae and is endemic to southwestern Western Australia. It is a small shrub with curved, long, needle-shaped leaves and more or less spherical heads of hairy cream-coloured to pale yellow flowers.

Description
The flowers are arranged on the ends of branchlets in sessile, more or less spherical heads with a few narrow egg-shaped involucral bracts at the base.

Taxonomy
Petrophile filifolia was first formally described in 1810 by Robert Brown in the Transactions of the Linnean Society of London. The specific epithet (filifolia) means "thread-leaved".

In 2005, Barbara Lynette Rye and Michael C. Hislop described two subspecies in the journal Nuytsia and the names are accepted by the Australian Plant Census:
 Petrophile filifolia R.Br. subsp. filifolia;
 Petrophile filifolia subsp. laxa Rye & Hislop that differs from the autonym in having flowers with longer hairs on the pollen presenter.

Distribution and habitat
This petrophile grows in a variety of habitats between Armadale, the Perup River, the Stirling Range and Albany in the Jarrah Forest biogeographical region of southwestern Western Australia. Subspecies laxa grows in woodland and heath in the Armadale-Wandering area.<ref name="Nuytsia" /

Conservation status
Petrophile filifolia is classified as "not threatened" but subsp. laxa is classified as "Priority Three" by the Government of Western Australia Department of Parks and Wildlife meaning that it is poorly known and known from only a few locations but is not under imminent threat.

References

filifolia
Eudicots of Western Australia
Endemic flora of Western Australia
Plants described in 1810
Taxa named by Robert Brown (botanist, born 1773)